William Massot (born 1 September 1977 in Nîmes) is a French professional footballer. He last played in the Championnat National for Rodez AF.

Massot played at the professional level in Ligue 2 for Nîmes Olympique and Stade Brestois 29.

External links

1977 births
Living people
French footballers
Ligue 2 players
Nîmes Olympique players
Valenciennes FC players
Clermont Foot players
FC Sète 34 players
Stade Brestois 29 players
Rodez AF players
Footballers from Nîmes
Association football defenders